Leo Pando is an American politician who was active in local politics in Cheyenne, Wyoming. He served in the Cheyenne city council and as the 53rd Mayor of Cheyenne, Wyoming.

Career

Leo Pando served as a police detective in the Cheyenne, Wyoming police department. In 1988, Pando was elected to the city council in Cheyenne from Ward 2 alongside Joseph C. Dougherty. Pando was selected to serve as the vice-president of the city council.

In 1992, Pando ran in Cheyenne's mayoral election against incumbent Mayor Gary Schaeffer. He placed second in the primary behind Schaeffer and defeated Schaeffer in the general election. Pando ran for reelection in 1996, placed first out of eight candidates in the primary, and defeated Rod Miller in the general election. 

Pando ran for reelection in 2000, placed first in the primary, but was defeated in the general election by Jack Spiker. Pando had spent $20,386 against Spiker's $13,449, and he had outraised Spiker.

Pando appointed Mark Moran to replace Bernard Pitts, who had served since March 1986, as municipal court judge starting on July 1. 1999, and Moran served until 2019. In 2000, Pando successfully requested the resignation of Frederika Barlea, the Cheyenne city treasurer, after Barela admitted to knowing about up to $600,000 in unreconciled bank statements and not sending the statements to Pando.

Electoral history

References

20th-century American politicians
Mayors of Cheyenne, Wyoming